Liquefied natural gas (LNG) is natural gas (predominantly methane, CH4, with some mixture of ethane, C2H6) that has been cooled down to liquid form for ease and safety of non-pressurized storage or transport. It takes up about 1/600th the volume of natural gas in the gaseous state (at standard conditions for temperature and pressure).

LNG is odorless, colorless, non-toxic and non-corrosive. Hazards include flammability after vaporization into a gaseous state, freezing and asphyxia. The liquefaction process involves removal of certain components, such as dust, acid gases, helium, water, and heavy hydrocarbons, which could cause difficulty downstream.

The gas extracted from underground hydrocarbon deposits contains a varying mix of hydrocarbon components, which usually includes mostly methane (CH4), along with ethane (C2H6), propane (C3H8) and butane (C4H10).  Other gases also occur in natural gas, notably CO2.  These gases have wide-ranging boiling points and also different heating values, allowing different routes to commercialization and also different uses. The "acidic" elements such as hydrogen sulphide (H2S) and carbon dioxide (CO2), together with oil, mud, water, and mercury, are removed from the gas to deliver a clean sweetened stream of gas. Failure to remove much or all of such acidic molecules, mercury, and other impurities could result in damage to the equipment. Corrosion of steel pipes and amalgamization of mercury to aluminum within cryogenic heat exchangers could cause expensive damage.

The gas stream is typically separated into the liquefied petroleum fractions (butane and propane), which can be stored in liquid form at relatively low pressure, and the lighter ethane and methane fractions. These lighter fractions of methane and ethane are then liquefied to make up the bulk of LNG that is shipped.

Natural gas was considered during the 20th century to be economically unimportant wherever gas-producing oil or gas fields were distant from gas pipelines or located in offshore locations where pipelines were not viable. In the past this usually meant that natural gas produced was typically flared, especially since unlike oil, no viable method for natural gas storage or transport existed other than compressed gas pipelines to end users of the same gas. This meant that natural gas markets were historically entirely local, and any production had to be consumed within the local or regional network.

Developments of production processes, cryogenic storage, and transportation effectively created the tools required to commercialize natural gas into a global market which now competes with other fuels. Furthermore, the development of LNG storage also introduced a reliability in networks which was previously thought impossible. Given that storage of other fuels is relatively easily secured using simple tanks, a supply for several months could be kept in storage. With the advent of large-scale cryogenic storage, it became possible to create long term gas storage reserves. These reserves of liquefied gas could be deployed at a moment's notice through regasification processes, and today are the main means for networks to handle local peak shaving requirements.

Specific energy content and energy density 
The heating value depends on the source of gas that is used and the process that is used to liquefy the gas. The range of heating value can span ±10 to 15 percent. A typical value of the higher heating value of LNG is approximately 50 MJ/kg or 21,500 BTU/lb. A typical value of the lower heating value of LNG is 45 MJ/kg or 19,350 BTU/lb.

For the purpose of comparison of different fuels, the heating value may be expressed in terms of energy per volume, which is known as the energy density expressed in MJ/litre. The density of LNG is roughly 0.41 kg/litre to 0.5 kg/litre, depending on temperature, pressure, and composition, compared to water at 1.0 kg/litre. Using the median value of 0.45 kg/litre, the typical energy density values are 22.5 MJ/litre (based on higher heating value) or 20.3 MJ/litre (based on lower heating value).

The volumetric energy density of LNG is approximately 2.4 times that of compressed natural gas (CNG), which makes it economical to transport natural gas by ship in the form of LNG. The energy density of LNG is comparable to propane and ethanol but is only 60 percent that of diesel and 70 percent that of gasoline.

History 
Experiments on the properties of gases started early in the seventeenth century. By the middle of the seventeenth century Robert Boyle had derived the inverse relationship between the pressure and the volume of gases. About the same time, Guillaume Amontons started looking into temperature effects on gas. Various gas experiments continued for the next 200 years. During that time there were efforts to liquefy gases. Many new facts about the nature of gases were discovered. For example, early in the nineteenth century Cagniard de la Tour showed there was a temperature above which a gas could not be liquefied. There was a major push in the mid to late nineteenth century to liquefy all gases. A number of scientists including Michael Faraday, James Joule, and William Thomson (Lord Kelvin) did experiments in this area. In 1886 Karol Olszewski liquefied methane, the primary constituent of natural gas. By 1900 all gases had been liquefied except helium, which was liquefied in 1908.

The first large-scale liquefaction of natural gas in the U.S. was in 1918 when the U.S. government liquefied natural gas as a way to extract helium, which is a small component of some natural gas. This helium was intended for use in British dirigibles for World War I. The liquid natural gas (LNG) was not stored, but regasified and immediately put into the gas mains.

The key patents having to do with natural gas liquefaction date from 1915 and the mid-1930s. In 1915 Godfrey Cabot patented a method for storing liquid gases at very low temperatures. It consisted of a Thermos bottle-type design which included a cold inner tank within an outer tank; the tanks being separated by insulation. In 1937 Lee Twomey received patents for a process for large-scale liquefaction of natural gas. The intention was to store natural gas as a liquid so it could be used for shaving peak energy loads during cold snaps. Because of large volumes it is not practical to store natural gas, as a gas, near atmospheric pressure. However, when liquefied, it can be stored in a volume 1/600th as large.

There are two processes for liquefying natural gas in large quantities. The first is the cascade process, in which the natural gas is cooled by another gas which in turn has been cooled by still another gas, hence named the "cascade" process. There are usually two cascade cycles before the liquid natural gas cycle. The other method is the Linde process, with a variation of the Linde process, called the Claude process, being sometimes used. In this process, the gas is cooled regeneratively by continually passing and expanding it through an orifice until it is cooled to temperatures at which it liquefies. This process was developed by James Joule and William Thomson and is known as the Joule–Thomson effect. Lee Twomey used the cascade process for his patents.

Commercial operations in the United States 

The East Ohio Gas Company built a full-scale commercial LNG plant in Cleveland, Ohio, in 1940 just after a successful pilot plant built by its sister company, Hope Natural Gas Company of West Virginia. This was the first such plant in the world. Originally it had three spheres, approximately 63 feet in diameter containing LNG at −260 °F. Each sphere held the equivalent of about 50 million cubic feet of natural gas. A fourth tank, a cylinder, was added in 1942. It had an equivalent capacity of 100 million cubic feet of gas. The plant operated successfully for three years. The stored gas was regasified and put into the mains when cold snaps hit and extra capacity was needed. This precluded the denial of gas to some customers during a cold snap.

The Cleveland plant failed on October 20, 1944, when the cylindrical tank ruptured, spilling thousands of gallons of LNG over the plant and nearby neighborhood. The gas evaporated and caught fire, which caused 130 fatalities. The fire delayed further implementation of LNG facilities for several years. However, over the next 15 years new research on low-temperature alloys, and better insulation materials, set the stage for a revival of the industry. It restarted in 1959 when a U.S. World War II Liberty ship, the Methane Pioneer, converted to carry LNG, made a delivery of LNG from the U.S. Gulf Coast to energy-starved Great Britain. In June 1964, the world's first purpose-built LNG carrier, the Methane Princess, entered service. Soon after that a large natural gas field was discovered in Algeria. International trade in LNG quickly followed as LNG was shipped to France and Great Britain from the Algerian fields. One more important attribute of LNG had now been exploited. Once natural gas was liquefied it could not only be stored more easily, but it could be transported. Thus energy could now be shipped over the oceans via LNG the same way it was shipped in the form of oil.

The US LNG industry restarted in 1965 when a series of new plants were built in the U.S. The building continued through the 1970s. These plants were not only used for peak-shaving, as in Cleveland, but also for base-load supplies for places that never had natural gas before this. A number of import facilities were built on the East Coast in anticipation of the need to import energy via LNG. However, a recent boom in U.S. natural gas production (2010–2014), enabled by hydraulic fracturing ("fracking"), has many of these import facilities being considered as export facilities. The first U.S. LNG export was completed in early 2016.

LNG life-cycle 

The process begins with the pre-treatment of a feedstock of natural gas entering the system to remove impurities such as H2S, CO2, H2O, mercury and higher-chained hydrocarbons. Feedstock gas then enters the liquefaction unit where it is cooled to between -145 °C and -163 °C  Although the type or number of heating cycles and/or refrigerants used may vary based on the technology, the basic process involves circulating the gas through aluminum tube coils and exposure to a compressed refrigerant. As the refrigerant is vaporized, the heat transfer causes the gas in the coils to cool. The LNG is then stored in a specialized double-walled insulated tank at atmospheric pressure ready to be transported to its final destination.

Most domestic LNG is transported by land via truck/trailer designed for cryogenic temperatures.  Intercontinental LNG transport travels by special tanker ships. LNG transport tanks comprise an internal steel or aluminum compartment and an external carbon or steel compartment with a vacuum system in between to reduce the amount of heat transfer. Once on site, the LNG must be stored in vacuum insulated or flat bottom storage tanks. When ready for distribution, the LNG enters a regasification facility where it is pumped into a vaporizer and heated back into gaseous form. The gas then enters the gas pipeline distribution system and is delivered to the end-user.

Production
The natural gas fed into the LNG plant will be treated to remove water, hydrogen sulfide, carbon dioxide, benzene and other components that will freeze under the low temperatures needed for storage or be destructive to the liquefaction facility. LNG typically contains more than 90% methane. It also contains small amounts of ethane, propane, butane, some heavier alkanes, and nitrogen. The purification process can be designed to give almost 100% methane. One of the risks of LNG is a rapid phase transition explosion (RPT), which occurs when cold LNG comes into contact with water.

The most important infrastructure needed for LNG production and transportation is an LNG plant consisting of one or more LNG trains, each of which is an independent unit for gas liquefaction and purification. A typical train consists of a compression area, propane condenser area, and methane and ethane areas.

The largest LNG train in operation is in Qatar, with a total production capacity of 7.8 million tonnes per annum (MTPA). LNG is loaded onto ships and delivered to a regasification terminal, where the LNG is allowed to expand and reconvert into gas. Regasification terminals are usually connected to a storage and pipeline distribution network to distribute natural gas to local distribution companies (LDCs) or independent power plants (IPPs).

LNG plant production
Information for the following table is derived in part from publication by the U.S. Energy Information Administration. 
See also List of LNG terminals

World total production

The LNG industry developed slowly during the second half of the last century because most LNG plants are located in remote areas not served by pipelines, and because of the high costs of treating and transporting LNG. Constructing an LNG plant costs at least $1.5 billion per 1 MTPA capacity, a receiving terminal costs $1 billion per 1 bcf/day throughput capacity and LNG vessels cost $200 million–$300 million.

In the early 2000s, prices for constructing LNG plants, receiving terminals and vessels fell as new technologies emerged and more players invested in liquefaction and regasification. This tended to make LNG more competitive as a means of energy distribution, but increasing material costs and demand for construction contractors have put upward pressure on prices in the last few years. 
The standard price for a 125,000 cubic meter LNG vessel built in European and Japanese shipyards used to be US$250 million. When Korean and Chinese shipyards entered the race, increased competition reduced profit margins and improved efficiency—reducing costs by 60 percent. Costs in US dollars also declined due to the devaluation of the currencies of the world's largest shipbuilders: the Japanese yen and Korean won.

Since 2004, the large number of orders increased demand for shipyard slots, raising their price and increasing ship costs. The per-ton construction cost of an LNG liquefaction plant fell steadily from the 1970s through the 1990s. The cost reduced by approximately 35 percent. However, recently the cost of building liquefaction and regasification terminals doubled due to increased cost of materials and a shortage of skilled labor, professional engineers, designers, managers and other white-collar professionals.

Due to natural gas shortage concerns in the northeastern U.S. and surplus natural gas in the rest of the country, many new LNG import and export terminals are being contemplated in the United States. Concerns about the safety of such facilities create controversy in some regions where they are proposed. One such location is in the Long Island Sound between Connecticut and Long Island. Broadwater Energy, an effort of TransCanada Corp. and Shell, wishes to build an LNG import terminal in the sound on the New York side. Local politicians including the Suffolk County Executive raised questions about the terminal. In 2005, New York Senators Chuck Schumer and Hillary Clinton also announced their opposition to the project.  Several import terminal proposals along the coast of Maine were also met with high levels of resistance and questions. On Sep. 13, 2013 the U.S. Department of Energy approved Dominion Cove Point's application to export up to 770 million cubic feet per day of LNG to countries that do not have a free trade agreement with the U.S. In May 2014, the FERC concluded its environmental assessment of the Cove Point LNG project, which found that the proposed natural gas export project could be built and operated safely. Another LNG terminal is currently proposed for Elba Island, Ga. Plans for three LNG export terminals in the U.S. Gulf Coast region have also received conditional Federal approval. In Canada, an LNG export terminal is under construction near Guysborough, Nova Scotia.

Commercial aspects

Global Trade

In the commercial development of an LNG value chain, LNG suppliers first confirm sales to the downstream buyers and then sign long-term contracts (typically 20–25 years) with strict terms and structures for gas pricing. Only when the customers are confirmed and the development of a greenfield project deemed economically feasible, could the sponsors of an LNG project invest in their development and operation. Thus, the LNG liquefaction business has been limited to players with strong financial and political resources. Major international oil companies (IOCs) such as ExxonMobil, Royal Dutch Shell, BP, Chevron, TotalEnergies and national oil companies (NOCs) such as Pertamina and Petronas are active players.

LNG is shipped around the world in specially constructed seagoing vessels. The trade of LNG is completed by signing an SPA (sale and purchase agreement) between a supplier and receiving terminal, and by signing a GSA (gas sale agreement) between a receiving terminal and end-users. Most of the contract terms used to be DES or ex ship, holding the seller responsible for the transport of the gas. With low shipbuilding costs, and the buyers preferring to ensure reliable and stable supply, however, contracts with FOB terms increased. Under such terms the buyer, who often owns a vessel or signs a long-term charter agreement with independent carriers, is responsible for the transport.

LNG purchasing agreements used to be for a long term with relatively little flexibility both in price and volume. If the annual contract quantity is confirmed, the buyer is obliged to take and pay for the product, or pay for it even if not taken, in what is referred to as the obligation of take-or-pay contract (TOP).

In the mid-1990s, LNG was a buyer's market. At the request of buyers, the SPAs began to adopt some flexibilities on volume and price. The buyers had more upward and downward flexibilities in TOP, and short-term SPAs less than 16 years came into effect. At the same time, alternative destinations for cargo and arbitrage were also allowed. By the turn of the 21st century, the market was again in favor of sellers. However, sellers have become more sophisticated and are now proposing sharing of arbitrage opportunities and moving away from S-curve pricing. There has been much discussion regarding the creation of an "OGEC" as a natural gas equivalent of OPEC. Russia and Qatar, countries with the largest and the third largest natural gas reserves in the world, have finally supported such move.

Until 2003, LNG prices have closely followed oil prices. Since then, LNG prices in Europe and Japan have been lower than oil prices, although the link between LNG and oil is still strong. In contrast, prices in the US and the UK have recently skyrocketed, then fallen as a result of changes in supply and storage.  In the late 1990s and early 2000s, the market shifted for buyers, but since 2003 and 2004, it has been a strong seller's market, with net-back as the best estimation for prices..

Research from Global Energy Monitor in 2019 warned that up to US$1.3 trillion in new LNG export and import infrastructure currently under development is at significant risk of becoming stranded, as global gas risks becoming oversupplied, particularly if the United States and Canada play a larger role.

The current surge in unconventional oil and gas in the U.S. has resulted in lower gas prices in the U.S. This has led to discussions in Asia' oil linked gas markets to import gas based on Henry Hub index. Recent high level conference in Vancouver, the Pacific Energy Summit 2013 Pacific Energy Summit 2013 convened policy makers and experts from Asia and the U.S. to discuss LNG trade relations between these regions.

Receiving terminals exist in about 40 countries, including Belgium, Chile, China, the Dominican Republic, France, Greece, India, Italy, Japan, Korea, Poland, Spain, Taiwan, the UK, the US, among others. Plans exist for Bahrain, Germany, Ghana, Morocco, Philippines, Vietnam and others to also construct new receiving (regasification) terminals.

LNG Project Screening
Base load (large-scale, >1 MTPA) LNG projects require natural gas reserves, buyers and financing. Using proven technology and a proven contractor is extremely important for both investors and buyers. Gas reserves required: 1 tcf of gas required per Mtpa of LNG over
20 years.

LNG is most cost efficiently produced in relatively large facilities due to economies of scale, at sites with marine access allowing regular large bulk shipments direct to market. This requires a secure gas supply of sufficient capacity. Ideally, facilities are located close to the gas source, to minimize the cost of intermediate transport infrastructure and gas shrinkage (fuel loss in transport). The high cost of building large LNG facilities makes the progressive development of gas sources to maximize facility utilization essential, and the life extension of existing, financially depreciated LNG facilities cost effective. Particularly when combined with lower sale prices due to large installed capacity and rising construction costs, this makes the economic screening/ justification to develop new, and especially greenfield, LNG facilities challenging, even if these could be more environmentally friendly than existing facilities with all stakeholder concerns satisfied. Due to high financial risk, it is usual to contractually secure gas supply/ concessions and gas sales for extended periods before proceeding to an investment decision.

Uses
The primary use of LNG is to simplify transport of natural gas from the source to a destination. On the large scale, this is done when the source and the destination are across an ocean from each other. It can also be used when adequate pipeline capacity is not available. For large-scale transport uses, the LNG is typically regassified at the receiving end and pushed into the local natural gas pipeline infrastructure.

LNG can also be used to meet peak demand when the normal pipeline infrastructure can meet most demand needs, but not the peak demand needs. These plants are typically called LNG Peak Shaving Plants as the purpose is to shave off part of the peak demand from what is required out of the supply pipeline.

LNG can be used to fuel internal combustion engines. LNG is in the early stages of becoming a mainstream fuel for transportation needs. It is being evaluated and tested for over-the-road trucking, off-road, marine, and train applications. There are known problems with the fuel tanks and delivery of gas to the engine, but despite these concerns the move to LNG as a transportation fuel has begun. LNG competes directly with compressed natural gas as a fuel for natural gas vehicles since the engine is identical. There may be applications where LNG trucks, buses, trains and boats could be cost-effective in order to regularly distribute LNG energy together with general freight and/or passengers to smaller, isolated communities without a local gas source or access to pipelines.

Use of LNG to fuel large over-the-road trucks

China has been a leader in the use of LNG vehicles with over  LNG-powered vehicles on the road as of Sept 2014.

In the United States the beginnings of a public LNG Fueling capability is being put in place. An alternative fuelling centre tracking site shows 84 public truck LNG fuel centres as of Dec 2016. It is possible for large trucks to make cross country trips such as Los Angeles to Boston and refuel at public refuelling stations every 500 miles. The 2013 National Trucker's Directory lists approximately 7,000 truckstops, thus approximately 1% of US truckstops have LNG available.

While as of December 2014 LNG fuel and NGV's were not taken to very quickly within Europe and it was questionable whether LNG will ever become the fuel of choice among fleet operators recent trends from 2018 onwards show different prospect.
During the year 2015, Netherlands introduced LNG powered trucks in transport sector. Australian government is planning to develop an LNG highway to utilise the locally produced LNG and replace the imported diesel fuel used by interstate haulage vehicles.

In the year 2015, India also made small beginning by transporting LNG by LNG powered road tankers in Kerala state. In 2017, Petronet LNG is setting up 20 LNG stations on highways along the Indian west coast that connect Delhi with Thiruvananthapuram covering a total distance of 4,500 km via Mumbai and Bengaluru. In 2020, India planned to install 24 LNG fuelling stations along the 6,000 km Golden Quadrilateral highways connecting the four metros due to LNG prices decreasing in price.

Japan, the world's largest importer of LNG, is set to use of LNG as road transport fuel.

High-horsepower/high-torque engines 

Engine displacement is an important factor in the power of an internal combustion engine. Thus a 2,000 cc engine would typically be more powerful than an 1,800 cc engine, but that assumes a similar air-fuel mixture is used.

However, if the smaller engine uses an air-fuel mixture with higher energy density (such as via a turbocharger), then it may be able to produce more power than the larger one burning a less energy dense air-fuel mixture. This is not easily achieved, since turbochargers are both complex and expensive. Thus for high-horsepower/high-torque engines, a fuel that creates a more energy dense air-fuel mixture is preferred, because a smaller and simpler engine can produce the same power.

With traditional gasoline and diesel engines the energy density of the air-fuel mixture is limited because the liquid fuels do not mix well in the cylinder. Further, gasoline and diesel fuel have autoignition temperatures and pressures relevant to engine design. An important part of traditional engine design is designing the cylinders, compression ratios, and fuel injectors such that pre-ignition is prevented but at the same time as much fuel as possible can be injected, become well mixed, and still have time to complete the combustion process during the power stroke.

Natural gas does not auto-ignite at pressures and temperatures relevant to traditional gasoline and diesel engine design, thus providing more flexibility in the design of a natural gas engine.

With a compressed natural gas (CNG) engine, the mixing of the fuel and the air is more effective since gases typically mix well in a short period of time, but at typical CNG compression pressures the fuel itself is less energy dense than gasoline or diesel thus the result is a less energy-dense air-fuel mixture. Thus for the same cylinder displacement engine, a non turbocharged CNG powered engine is typically less powerful than a similarly sized gas or diesel engine. For that reason turbochargers are popular on European CNG cars. Despite that limitation, the 12 litre Cummins Westport ISX12G engine is an example of a CNG capable engine designed to pull tractor/trailer loads up to 80,000 lbs showing CNG can be used in most if not all on-road truck applications. The original ISX G engines incorporated a turbocharger to enhance the air-fuel energy density.

LNG offers a unique advantage over CNG for more demanding high-horsepower applications by eliminating the need for a turbocharger. A properly designed high-horsepower engine can leverage this extremely high pressure energy dense gaseous fuel source to create a higher energy density air-fuel mixture than can be efficiently created with a CNG powered engine. The result when compared to CNG engines is more overall efficiency in high-horsepower engine applications when high-pressure direct injection technology is used. The Westport HDMI2 fuel system is an example of a high-pressure direct injection technology that does not require a turbocharger if teamed with appropriate LNG heat exchanger technology. The Volvo Trucks 13-litre LNG engine is another example of a LNG engine leveraging advanced high pressure technology.

Westport recommends CNG for engines 7 litres or smaller and LNG with direct injection for engines between 20 and 150 litres. For engines between 7 and 20 litres either option is recommended. See slide 13 from their NGV Bruxelles – Industry Innovation Session presentation

High horsepower engines in the oil drilling, mining, locomotive, and marine fields have been or are being developed. Paul Blomerus has written a paper concluding as much as 40 million tonnes per annum of LNG (approximately 26.1 billion gallons/year or 71 million gallons/day) could be required just to meet the global needs of the high-horsepower engines by 2025 to 2030.

As of the end of 1st quarter 2015, Prometheus Energy Group Inc claimed to have delivered over 100 million gallons of LNG within the previous four years to the industrial market, and is continuing to add new customers.

Use of LNG in maritime applications
LNG bunkering has been established in some ports via truck-to-ship fueling. This type of LNG fueling is straightforward to implement, assuming a supply of LNG is available.

Feeder and short-sea shipping company Unifeeder has been operating the world's first LNG powered container vessel, the Wes Amelie, since late 2017, transiting between the port of Rotterdam and the Baltics on a weekly schedule.
Container shipping company Maersk Group has decided to introduce LNG-powered container ships. The DEME Group has contracted Wärtsilä to power its new generation ‘Antigoon’ class dredger with dual fuel (DF) engines. Crowley Maritime of Jacksonville, Florida, launched two LNG-powered ConRo ships, the Coquí and Taino, in 2018 and 2019, respectively.

In 2014, Shell ordered a dedicated LNG bunker vessel. It is planned to go into service in Rotterdam in the summer of 2017

The International Convention for the Prevention of Pollution from Ships (MARPOL), adopted by the IMO, has mandated that marine vessels shall not consume fuel (bunker fuel, diesel, etc.) with a sulphur content greater than 0.5% from the year 2020 within international waters and the coastal areas of countries adopting the same regulation. Replacement of high sulphur bunker fuel with sulphur-free LNG is required on a major scale in the marine transport sector, as low sulphur liquid fuels are costlier than LNG. Japan's is planning to use LNG as bunker fuel by 2020.

BHP, one of the largest mining companies in the world, is aiming to commission minerals transport ships powered with LNG by late 2021.

In January 2021, 175 sea-going LNG-powered ships were in service, with another 200 ships ordered.

Use of LNG on rail
Florida East Coast Railway has 24 GE ES44C4 locomotives adapted to run on LNG fuel.

Trade
The global trade in LNG is growing rapidly from negligible in 1970 to what is expected to be a globally substantial amount by 2020.

In 1970, global LNG trade was of 3 billion cubic metres (bcm) (0.11 quads). In 2011, it was 331 bcm (11.92 quads). The U.S. started exporting LNG in February 2016. E&Y projects global LNG demand could hit 400 mtpa (19.7 quads) by 2020. If that occurs, the LNG market will be roughly 10% the size of the global crude oil market, and that does not count the vast majority of natural gas which is delivered via pipeline directly from the well to the consumer.

In 2004, LNG accounted for 7 percent of the world's natural gas demand.  The global trade in LNG, which has increased at a rate of 7.4 percent per year over the decade from 1995 to 2005, is expected to continue to grow substantially.  LNG trade is expected to increase at 6.7 percent per year from 2005 to 2020.

Until the mid-1990s, LNG demand was heavily concentrated in Northeast Asia: Japan, South Korea and Taiwan.  At the same time, Pacific Basin supplies dominated world LNG trade.  The worldwide interest in using natural gas-fired combined cycle generating units for electric power generation, coupled with the inability of North American and North Sea natural gas supplies to meet the growing demand, substantially broadened the regional
markets for LNG. It also brought new Atlantic Basin and Middle East suppliers into the trade.

By the end of 2017, there were 19 LNG exporting countries and 40 LNG importing countries.  The three biggest LNG exporters in 2017 were Qatar (77.5 MT), Australia (55.6 MT) and Malaysia (26.9 MT). The three biggest LNG importers in 2017 were Japan (83.5 MT), China (39 MT) and South Korea (37.8 MT).  LNG trade volumes increased from 142 MT in 2005 to 159 MT in 2006, 165 MT in 2007, 171 MT in 2008,  220 MT in 2010, 237 MT in 2013, 264 MT in 2016 and 290 MT in 2017. Global LNG production was 246 MT in 2014, most of which was used in trade between countries. During the next several years there would be significant increase in volume of LNG Trade. For example, about 59 MTPA of new LNG supply from six new plants came to market just in 2009, including:
Northwest Shelf Train 5: 4.4 MTPA
Sakhalin-II: 9.6 MTPA
Yemen LNG:	6.7 MTPA
Tangguh: 7.6 MTPA
Qatargas: 15.6 MTPA
Rasgas Qatar: 15.6 MTPA

In 2006, Qatar became the world's biggest exporter of LNG. As of 2012, Qatar is the source of 25 percent of the world's LNG exports. As of 2017, Qatar was estimated to supply 26.7% of the world's LNG.

Investments in U.S. export facilities were increasing by 2013, these investments were spurred by increasing shale gas production in the United States and a large price differential between natural gas prices in the U.S. and those in Europe and Asia. Cheniere Energy became the first company in the United States to receive permission and export LNG in 2016. After a US-EU agreement in 2018, exports from USA to EU increased. In November 2021, U.S. producer Venture Global LNG signed a twenty-year contract with China's state-owned Sinopec to supply liquefied natural gas. China's imports of U.S. natural gas will more than double. U.S. exports of liquefied natural gas to China and other Asian countries surged in 2021, with Asian buyers willing to pay higher prices than European importers. This reversed in 2022, when most of US LNG went to Europe. US LNG export contracts are mainly made for 15—20 years.

Imports
In 1964, the UK and France made the first LNG trade, buying gas from Algeria, witnessing a new era of energy.

In 2014, 19 countries exported LNG.

Compared with the crude oil market, in 2013 the natural gas market was about 72 percent of the crude oil market (measured on a heat equivalent basis), of which LNG forms a small but rapidly growing part.  Much of this growth is driven by the need for clean fuel and some substitution effect due to the high price of oil (primarily in the heating and electricity generation sectors).

Japan, South Korea, Spain, France, Italy and Taiwan import large volumes of LNG due to their shortage of energy. In 2005, Japan imported 58.6 million tons of LNG, representing some 30 percent of the LNG trade around the world that year. Also in 2005, South Korea imported 22.1 million tons, and in 2004 Taiwan imported 6.8 million tons. These three major buyers purchase approximately two-thirds of the world's LNG demand. In addition, Spain imported some 8.2 MTPA in 2006, making it the third largest importer. France also imported similar quantities as Spain. Following the Fukushima Daiichi nuclear disaster in March 2011 Japan became a major importer accounting for one third of the total.
European LNG imports fell by 30 percent in 2012, and fell further by 24 percent in 2013, as South American and Asian importers paid more. European LNG imports increased to new heights in 2019, remained high in 2020 and 2021, and increased even more in 2022. Main contributors were Qatar, USA, and Russia.

In 2017, global LNG imports reached 289.8 million tonnes of LNG. In 2017, 72.9% of global LNG demand was located in Asia.

Cargo diversion
Based on the LNG SPAs, LNG is destined for pre-agreed destinations, and diversion of that LNG is not allowed.  However, if Seller and Buyer make a mutual agreement, then the diversion of the cargo is permitted — subject to sharing the additional profit created by such a diversion, by paying a penalty fee. In the European Union and some other jurisdictions, it is not permitted to apply the profit-sharing clause in LNG SPAs.

Cost of LNG plants

For an extended period of time, design improvements in liquefaction plants and tankers had the effect of reducing costs.

In the 1980s, the cost of building an LNG liquefaction plant cost $350/tpa (tonne per annum). In the 2000s, it was $200/tpa. In 2012, the costs can go as high as $1,000/tpa, partly due to the increase in the price of steel.

As recently as 2003, it was common to assume that this was a “learning curve” effect and would continue into the future. But this perception of steadily falling costs for LNG has been dashed in the last several years.

The construction cost of greenfield LNG projects started to skyrocket from 2004 afterward and has increased from about $400 per ton per year of capacity to $1,000 per ton per year of capacity in 2008.

The main reasons for skyrocketed costs in LNG industry can be described as follows:

Low availability of EPC contractors as result of extraordinary high level of ongoing petroleum projects worldwide.
High raw material prices as result of surge in demand for raw materials.
Lack of skilled and experienced workforce in LNG industry.
Devaluation of US dollar.
Very complex nature of projects built in remote locations and where construction costs are regarded as some of the highest in the world.

Excluding high cost projects the increase of 120% over the period 2002-2012 is more in line with escalation in the upstream oil & gas industry as reported by the UCCI index 

The 2007–2008 global financial crisis caused a general decline in raw material and equipment prices, which somewhat lessened the construction cost of LNG plants. However, by 2012 this was more than offset by increasing demand for materials and labor for the LNG market.

Small-scale liquefaction plants
Small-scale liquefaction plants are suitable for peakshaving on natural gas pipelines, transportation fuel, or for deliveries of natural gas to remote areas not connected to pipelines. They typically have a compact size, are fed from a natural gas pipeline, and are located close to the location where the LNG will be used. This proximity decreases transportation and LNG product costs for consumers. It also avoids the additional greenhouse gas emissions generated during long transportation.

The small-scale LNG plant also allows localized peakshaving to occur—balancing the availability of natural gas during high and low periods of demand. It also makes it possible for communities without access to natural gas pipelines to install local distribution systems and have them supplied with stored LNG.

LNG pricing

There are three major pricing systems in the current LNG contracts:
Oil indexed contract, used primarily in Japan, Korea, Taiwan and China;
Oil, oil products and other energy carriers indexed contracts, used primarily in Continental Europe; and
Market indexed contracts, used in the US and the UK.

The formula for an indexed price is as follows:

CP = BP + β X
BP: constant part or base price
β: gradient
X: indexation

The formula has been widely used in Asian LNG SPAs, where base price represents various non-oil factors, but usually a constant determined by negotiation at a level which can prevent LNG prices from falling below a certain level. It thus varies regardless of oil price fluctuation.

Henry Hub Plus
Some LNG buyers have already signed contracts for future US-based cargos at Henry Hub-linked prices. Cheniere Energy's LNG export contract pricing consists of a fixed fee (liquefaction tolling fee) plus 115% of Henry Hub per million British thermal units of LNG.

Oil parity

Oil parity is the LNG price that would be equal to that of crude oil on a barrel of oil equivalent (BOE) basis. If the LNG price exceeds the price of crude oil in BOE terms, then the situation is called broken oil parity.  A coefficient of 0.1724 results in full oil parity.  In most cases the price of LNG is less than the price of crude oil in BOE terms.  In 2009, in several spot cargo deals especially in East Asia, oil parity approached the full oil parity or even exceeded oil parity. In January 2016, the spot LNG price of  has broken oil parity when the Brent crude price (≤32 US$/bbl) has fallen steeply. By the end of June 2016, LNG price has fallen by nearly 50% below its oil parity price, making it more economical than more-polluting diesel/gas oil in the transport sector.

S-curve 
Most of the LNG trade is governed by long-term contracts.  Many formulae include an S-curve, where the price formula is different above and below a certain oil price, to dampen the impact of high oil prices on the buyer, and low oil prices on the seller.  When the spot LNG price is cheaper than long term oil price indexed contracts, the most profitable LNG end use is to power mobile engines for replacing costly gasoline and diesel consumption.

In most of the East Asian LNG contracts, price formula is indexed to a basket of crude imported to Japan called the Japan Crude Cocktail (JCC).  In Indonesian LNG contracts, price formula is linked to Indonesian Crude Price (ICP).

In continental Europe, the price formula indexation does not follow the same format, and it varies from contract to contract. Brent crude price (B), heavy fuel oil price (HFO), light fuel oil price (LFO), gas oil price (GO), coal price, electricity price and in some cases, consumer and producer price indexes are the indexation elements of price formulas.

Price review
Usually there exists a clause allowing parties to trigger the price revision or price reopening in LNG SPAs.  In some contracts there are two options for triggering a price revision. regular and special.  Regular ones are the dates that will be agreed and defined in the LNG SPAs for the purpose of price review.

Quality of LNG
LNG quality is one of the most important issues in the LNG business.  Any gas which does not conform to the agreed specifications in the sale and purchase agreement is regarded as “off-specification” (off-spec) or “off-quality” gas or LNG.  Quality regulations serve three purposes:

1 – to ensure that the gas distributed is non-corrosive and non-toxic, below the upper limits for H2S, total sulphur, CO2 and Hg content;

2 – to guard against the formation of liquids or hydrates in the networks, through maximum water and hydrocarbon dewpoints;

3 – to allow interchangeability of the gases distributed, via limits on the variation range for parameters affecting combustion: content of inert gases, calorific value, Wobbe index, Soot Index, Incomplete Combustion Factor, Yellow Tip Index, etc.

In the case of off-spec gas or LNG the buyer can refuse to accept the gas or LNG and the seller has to pay liquidated damages for the respective off-spec gas volumes.

The quality of gas or LNG is measured at delivery point by using an instrument such as a gas chromatograph.

The most important gas quality concerns involve the sulphur and mercury content and the calorific value.  Due to the sensitivity of liquefaction facilities to sulfur and mercury elements, the gas being sent to the liquefaction process shall be accurately refined and tested in order to assure the minimum possible concentration of these two elements before entering the liquefaction plant, hence there is not much concern about them.

However, the main concern is the heating value of gas.  Usually natural gas markets can be divided in three markets in terms of heating value:

Asia (Japan, Korea, Taiwan), where gas distributed is rich, with a gross calorific value (GCV) higher than 43 MJ/m3(n), i.e. 1,090 Btu/scf,
the UK and the US, where distributed gas is lean, with a GCV usually lower than 42 MJ/m3(n), i.e. 1,065 Btu/scf,
Continental Europe, where the acceptable GCV range is quite wide: approx. 39 to 46 MJ/m3(n), i.e. 990 to 1,160 Btu/scf.

There are some methods to modify the heating value of produced LNG to the desired level.  For the purpose of increasing the heating value, injecting propane and butane is a solution.  For the purpose of decreasing heating value, nitrogen injecting and extracting butane and propane are proven solutions.  Blending with gas or LNG can be a solution; however all of these solutions while theoretically viable can be costly and logistically difficult to manage in large scale. Lean LNG price in terms of energy value is lower than the rich LNG price.

Liquefaction technology

There are several liquefaction processes available for large, baseload LNG plants (in order of prevalence):
AP-C3MR – designed by Air Products & Chemicals, Inc. (APCI)
Cascade – designed by ConocoPhillips
AP-X – designed by Air Products & Chemicals, Inc. (APCI)
AP-SMR (Single Mixed Refrigerant) – designed by Air Products & Chemicals, Inc. (APCI)
AP-N (Nitrogen Refrigerant) – designed by Air Products & Chemicals, Inc. (APCI)
MFC (mixed fluid cascade) – designed by Linde
PRICO (SMR) – designed by Black & Veatch
AP-DMR (Dual Mixed Refrigerant) - designed by Air Products & Chemicals, Inc. (APCI)
Liquefin – designed by Air Liquide

As of January 2016, global nominal LNG liquefaction capacity was 301.5 MTPA (million tonnes per annum), with a further 142 MTPA under construction.

The majority of these trains use either APCI AP-C3MR or Cascade technology for the liquefaction process. The other processes, used in a small minority of some liquefaction plants, include Shell's DMR (double-mixed refrigerant) technology and the Linde technology.

APCI technology is the most-used liquefaction process in LNG plants:  out of 100 liquefaction trains onstream or under-construction, 86 trains with a total capacity of 243 MTPA have been designed based on the APCI process.  Phillips' Cascade process is the second most-used, used in 10 trains with a total capacity of 36.16 MTPA. The Shell DMR process has been used in three trains with total capacity of 13.9 MTPA; and, finally, the Linde/Statoil process is used in the Snohvit 4.2 MTPA single train.

Floating liquefied natural gas (FLNG) facilities float above an offshore gas field, and produce, liquefy, store and transfer LNG (and potentially LPG and condensate) at sea before carriers ship it directly to markets. The first FLNG facility is now in development by Shell, due for completion in 2018.

Storage

Modern LNG storage tanks are typically of the full containment type, which has a prestressed concrete outer wall and a high-nickel steel inner tank, with extremely efficient insulation between the walls. Large tanks are low aspect ratio (height to width) and cylindrical in design with a domed steel or concrete roof. Sometimes more expensive underground tanks are used for storage.
Smaller quantities (say  and less) may be stored in horizontal or vertical, vacuum-jacketed, pressure vessels. These tanks may be at pressures anywhere from less than 50 to over  kPa.

LNG must be kept cold to remain a liquid, independent of pressure. Despite efficient insulation, there will inevitably be some heat leakage into the LNG, resulting in vaporisation of the LNG. This boil-off gas acts to keep the LNG cold (see "Refrigeration" below). The boil-off gas is typically compressed and exported as natural gas, or it is reliquefied and returned to storage.

Transportation

LNG is transported in specially designed ships with double hulls protecting the cargo systems from damage or leaks. There are several special leak test methods available to test the integrity of an LNG vessel's membrane cargo tanks.

The tankers cost around US$200 million each.

Transportation and supply is an important aspect of the gas business, since natural gas reserves are normally quite distant from consumer markets. Natural gas has far more volume than oil to transport, and most gas is transported by pipelines. There is a natural gas pipeline network in the former Soviet Union, Europe and North America. Natural gas is less dense, even at higher pressures. Natural gas will travel much faster than oil through a high-pressure pipeline, but can transmit only about a fifth of the amount of energy per day due to the lower density.  Natural gas is usually liquefied to LNG at the end of the pipeline, before shipping.

Short LNG pipelines for use in moving product from LNG vessels to onshore storage are available. Longer pipelines, which allow vessels to offload LNG at a greater distance from port facilities, are under development.  This requires pipe-in-pipe technology due to requirements for keeping the LNG cold.

LNG is transported using tanker trucks, railway tanker cars, and purpose built ships known as LNG carriers. LNG is sometimes taken to cryogenic temperatures to increase the tanker capacity. The first commercial ship-to-ship transfer (STS) transfers were undertaken in February 2007 at the Flotta facility in Scapa Flow with 132,000 m3 of LNG being passed between the vessels Excalibur and Excelsior.  Transfers have also been carried out by Exmar Shipmanagement, the Belgian gas tanker owner in the Gulf of Mexico, which involved the transfer of LNG from a conventional LNG carrier to an LNG regasification vessel (LNGRV). Before this commercial exercise, LNG had only ever been transferred between ships on a handful of occasions as a necessity following an incident. The Society of International Gas Tanker and Terminal Operators (SIGTTO) is the responsible body for LNG operators around the world and seeks to disseminate knowledge regarding the safe transport of LNG at sea.

Besides LNG vessels, LNG is also used in some aircraft.

Terminals

Liquefied natural gas is used to transport natural gas over long distances, often by sea. In most cases, LNG terminals are purpose-built ports used exclusively to export or import LNG.

The United Kingdom has LNG import facilities for up to 50 billion cubic meters per year.

Refrigeration

The insulation, as efficient as it is, will not keep LNG cold enough by itself.  Inevitably, heat leakage will warm and vapourise the LNG.  Industry practice is to store LNG as a boiling cryogen.  That is, the liquid is stored at its boiling point for the pressure at which it is stored (atmospheric pressure).  As the vapour boils off, heat for the phase change cools the remaining liquid.  Because the insulation is very efficient, only a relatively small amount of boil-off is necessary to maintain temperature.  This phenomenon is also called auto-refrigeration.

Boil-off gas from land based LNG storage tanks is usually compressed and fed to natural gas pipeline networks.  Some LNG carriers use boil-off gas for fuel.

Environmental concerns

Natural gas could be considered the least environmentally harmful fossil fuel because it has the lowest CO2 emissions per unit of energy and is suitable for use in high efficiency combined cycle power stations. For an equivalent amount of heat, burning natural gas produces about 30 percent less carbon dioxide than burning petroleum and about 45 per cent less than burning coal.
 Biomethane is considered roughly -neutral and avoids most of the -emissions issue. If liquified (as LBM), it serves the same functions as LNG.

On a per kilometre transported basis, emissions from LNG are lower than piped natural gas, which is a particular issue in Europe, where significant amounts of gas are piped several thousand kilometres from Russia. However, emissions from natural gas transported as LNG are higher than those of natural gas produced locally to the point of combustion, as emissions associated with transport are lower for the latter.

However, on the West Coast of the United States, where up to three new LNG importation terminals were proposed before the U.S. fracking boom, environmental groups, such as Pacific Environment, Ratepayers for Affordable Clean Energy (RACE), and Rising Tide had moved to oppose them. They claimed that, while natural gas power plants emit approximately half the carbon dioxide of an equivalent coal power plant, the natural gas combustion required to produce and transport LNG to the plants adds 20 to 40 percent more carbon dioxide than burning natural gas alone. A 2015 peer reviewed study evaluated the full end-to-end life cycle of LNG produced in the U.S. and consumed in Europe or Asia. It concluded that global  production would be reduced due to the resulting reduction in other fossil fuels burned. 

Some scientists and local residents have raised concerns about the potential effect of Poland's underground LNG storage infrastructure on marine life in the Baltic Sea. Similar concerns were raised in Croatia.

Safety and accidents
Natural gas is a fuel and a combustible substance. To ensure safe and reliable operation, particular measures are taken in the design, construction and operation of LNG facilities. In maritime transport, the regulations for the use of LNG as a marine fuel are set out in the IGF Code.

In its liquid state, LNG is not explosive and can not ignite. For LNG to burn, it must first vaporize, then mix with air in the proper proportions (the flammable range is 5 percent to 15 percent), and then be ignited. In the case of a leak, LNG vaporizes rapidly, turning into a gas (methane plus trace gases), and mixing with air. If this mixture is within the flammable range, there is risk of ignition, which would create fire and thermal radiation hazards.

Gas venting from vehicles powered by LNG may create a flammability hazard if parked indoors for longer than a week. Additionally, due to its low temperature, refueling a LNG-powered vehicle requires training to avoid the risk of frostbite.

LNG tankers have sailed over 100 million miles without a shipboard death or even a major accident.

Several on-site accidents involving or related to LNG are listed below:
 October 20, 1944, Cleveland, Ohio, U.S.  The East Ohio Natural Gas Co. experienced a failure of an LNG tank. 128 people perished in the explosion and fire. The tank did not have a dike retaining wall, and it was made during World War II, when metal rationing was very strict. The steel of the tank was made with an extremely low amount of nickel, which meant the tank was brittle when exposed to the cryogenic nature of LNG. The tank ruptured, spilling LNG into the city sewer system. The LNG vaporized and turned into gas, which exploded and burned.
 February 10, 1973, Staten Island, New York, U.S.  During a cleaning operation, 42 workers were inside one of the TETCo LNG tanks, which had supposedly been completely drained ten months earlier. However, ignition occurred, causing a plume of combusting gas to rise within the tank. Two workers near the top felt the heat and rushed to the safety of scaffolding outside, while the other 40 workers died as the concrete cap on the tank rose 20–30 feet in the air and then came crashing back down, crushing them to death.
 October 6, 1979, Lusby, Maryland, US. A pump seal failed at the Cove Point LNG import facility, releasing natural gas vapors (not LNG), which entered an electrical conduit. A worker switched off a circuit breaker, which ignited the gas vapors. The resulting explosion killed a worker, severely injured another and caused heavy damage to the building. A safety analysis was not required at the time, and none was performed during the planning, design or construction of the facility. National fire codes were changed as a result of the accident.
 January 19, 2004, Skikda, Algeria. Explosion at Sonatrach LNG liquefaction facility. 27 killed, 56 injured, three LNG trains destroyed, a marine berth damaged. 2004 production was reduced by 76 percent. Total loss was US$900 million. A steam boiler that was part of an LNG liquefaction train exploded, triggering a massive hydrocarbon gas explosion. The explosion occurred where propane and ethane refrigeration storage were located. Site distribution of the units caused a domino effect of explosions. It remains unclear if LNG or LNG vapour, or other hydrocarbon gases forming part of the liquefaction process initiated the explosions. One report, of the US Government Team Site Inspection of the Sonatrach Skikda LNG Plant in Skikda, Algeria, March 12–16, 2004, has cited it was a leak of hydrocarbons from the refrigerant (liquefaction) process system.

Security concerns

On 8 May 2018, the United States withdrew from the Joint Comprehensive Plan of Action with Iran, reinstating Iran sanctions against their nuclear program. In response, Iran threatened to close off the Strait of Hormuz to international shipping. The Strait of Hormuz is a strategic route through which a third of the world's LNG passes from Middle East producers.

See also

 Gas carrier
 CNG carrier
 Gas to liquids
 Gasoline gallon equivalent
 Industrial gas
 Liquefied petroleum gas
 LNG regasification 
 LNG spill
 Natural gas liquids (NGL)
 Natural gas storage
 Peak Gas

References

External links
GIIGNL 2018 Annual Report (video) 
LNG educational Video. How Natural Gas is compressed into Liquid Natural Gas for transport (Shell).
 Center For LNG
 LNG news and industry magazine
 Gasworld website
 New LNG Plant Technology
 What is LNG and how is it becoming a U.S. energy source?
 Liquefied Natural Gas in the US: Federal Energy Regulatory Commission (FERC)
 LNG safety
 Alternative Fuel Vehicle Training From the National Alternative Fuels Training Consortium
 LNG Safety "The Risks and Dangers of LNG" is an exhaustive report prepared by CH·IV International President, Jeff Beale, analyzing the points made in a controversial Anti-LNG video.
 LNG Terminal Siting Standards Organization Advocating Government Adoption of LNG Industry Standards
 Prospects for Development of LNG in Russia Konstantin Simonov's speech at LNG 2008. April 23, 2008.
 The Terrorist Threat to Liquefied Natural Gas: Fact or Fiction?
 Asia's growing share in global LNG market via World Review
 Glossary - U.S. Energy Information Administration (EIA)
 BP's Energy Outlook 2035 with access to downloads of global historical data
 The Global Liquefied Natural Gas Market: Status and Outlook – (Adobe Acrobat *.PDF document)
 California Energy Commission: The Outlook for Global Trade in Liquefied Natural Gas Projections to the Year 2020 – (Adobe Acrobat *.PDF document)
 Guidance on Risk Analysis and Safety Implications of a Large Liquefied Natural Gas (LNG) Spill Over Water – (Adobe Acrobat *.PDF document)
 The International Group of Liquefied Natural Gas Importers (GIIGNL)
 The LNG Industry 2008 - (Adobe Acrobat *.PDF document)
 Society of International Gas Tanker and Terminal Operators World LNG Industry Standards

 
Fuel gas
Natural gas
Petroleum production
Industrial gases